Misanthrope may refer to:

Misanthropy, a generalized contempt or hatred of humanity

Theatre 
The Misanthrope, a 1666 play by Molière
Dyskolos, sometimes translated The Misanthrope, an Ancient Greek comedy by Menander

Music 
The Misanthrope (album), a 1996 EP by the melodic death metal band Darkest Hour
Misanthrope (band), French metal band
Mis•an•thrope,  the debut studio album by Ded

Art 
The Misanthrope (Bruegel), painting by Pieter Bruegel the Elder from 1568

Film 
The Misanthrope (1923 film), a 1923 German silent film directed by Rudolf Walther-Fein
The Misanthrope (1974 film), a 1974 Australian film adaptation of the play by Molière

See also
Misanthrope Immortel, sixth studio album by French metal band Misanthrope
Symphony for a Misanthrope, fifth studio album by progressive metal /rock band Magellan
Misanthropic (album), a 1997 EP by Dismember
Misanthropy Records, a British record label
Philanthropy, the love of humanity
Misandry, the hatred of, contempt for, or prejudice against men or boys
Misogyny, the hatred of, contempt for, or prejudice against women or girls